Dillian Whyte (born 11 April 1988) is a British professional boxer who has formerly competed as a kickboxer and mixed martial artist. He has held the WBC interim heavyweight title twice between 2019 and 2022. At regional level he has held multiple heavyweight championships, including the British title from 2016 to 2017. As of October 2021, he is ranked as the world's fifth-best active heavyweight by The Ring magazine, and the fourth-best active heavyweight by the Transnational Boxing Rankings Board and BoxRec. He has been ranked among BoxRec's top 10 heavyweights since 2016, reaching his career-high ranking of No. 2 at the end of August 2021. His knockout-to-win percentage stands at 68%.

Whyte is also a former kickboxing champion, having held the BIKMA British super-heavyweight title and the European K1 title, and has competed professionally in mixed martial arts.

Early life
Whyte was born in Port Antonio, Portland, Jamaica, on 11 April 1988. Whyte moved with his family  to the United Kingdom at 12 years of age. His paternal grandfather was an Irishman named Patrick Whyte, who emigrated to Jamaica from Dublin, Ireland. Whyte has also talked about having his first child at 13. Of his early life Whyte has spoken of performance in academia at school in England, while adding: "I had no schooling at all when I lived in Jamaica." As Whyte mentioned on iFL TV numerous times, he had a difficult upbringing in Jamaica, where he was "dodging bullets". Whyte grew up in Brixton, London and fought at Miguel's Boxing Gym. He had spoken of the influencing experience boxing has had upon his early life, by stating: "I didn't do too well at school, to be honest, but boxing saved me and changed my life. And it was going well, because I knew it was my best chance in life."

Professional kickboxing career
Originally, Whyte was a professional kickboxer, to which he became two-time British heavyweight kickboxing champion by claiming the BIKMA super-heavyweight British title, and one-time European K1 champion, while being ranked UK #1 for five years in his weight category of 95 kg +, ending his kickboxing career with a K-1 record of 20–1, before then turning to MMA. Whyte made his professional MMA debut on 6 December 2008, at the Ultimate Challenge MMA, on the James McSweeney vs. Neil Grove undercard, where he defeated Mark Stroud with a hugely destructive right cross only 12 seconds into the round; ultimately winning by knockout (KO) at The Troxy.

Kickboxing highlights

Defeated Daniel Sam (UK) UD-3 
Lost to Chris Knowles (UK) – Went to a deciding round for Knowles to become the new Pain & Glory UK K1 Champion – UD-4 
Defeated Will Riva (UK) to claim the WPKL British heavyweight title KO-3

Amateur boxing career
In his first amateur bout, in 2009, aged 20, Whyte beat Anthony Joshua by unanimous decision over three rounds. He had stated prior to the fight that his trainer Chris Okoh admitted that the decision to agree to the fight was then considered a risk, albeit ultimately accepting the fight to which Whyte had stated, "But I said I'd take it. Sometimes you've just got to take opportunities when they come."

He left one of his amateur opponents in a coma for several weeks due to a KO.

Whyte had a limited amateur record (6–0–0, 5 KOs) because of a dispute with the ABA regarding his kickboxing background, which led him to turn professional in 2011, although trainer Okoh wanted him to remain amateur. Whyte signed with boxing promoter Frank Maloney, after friends of Maloney witnessed sparring sessions Whyte had with David Haye and former UFC light-heavyweight champion Quinton Jackson.

Professional boxing career

Early career 
Whyte made his professional debut on 13 May 2011. He fought Tayar Mehmed and won via points decision (PTS) in the fourth round, obtaining the decision of 40–36. On 16 September 2011, Whyte made his second professional appearance against his Lithuanian heavyweight journeyman opponent Remigijus Ziausys. Whyte ultimately won by PTS in the fourth round, obtaining the decision of 40–37.

On 3 December 2011 Whyte defeated Croatian Toni Visic, winning by technical knockout (TKO) in the third round due to referee Jeff Hinds stopping the fight at 1 minute 46 seconds.

The next fight for Whyte was against veteran journeyman Hastings Rasani on 21 January 2012 at the Liverpool Olympia in Liverpool. Whyte scored a PTS win based over Rasani, making it his third win on points.

For his fifth professional bout, Whyte defeated Bulgarian Kristian Kirilov by TKO in the first round at The Troxy, Limehouse on 2 March 2012, which was followed by an additional TKO in his sixth bout in the first round on 19 May 2012 against Georgian Zurab Noniashvili at the Aintree Racecourse, Liverpool. Whyte went on to fight Hungarian giant Gabor Farkas at the York Hall in London on 7 July 2012, winning by second-round KO; it marked the first KO victory in Whyte's professional career.

Two months later on 15 September 2012, Whyte challenged former British heavyweight champion Mike Holden to a bout scheduled for six rounds. Holden was put down once in the second and twice in the third round, to which referee Jeff Hinds stopped the fight. Whyte's last fight of 2012 was against Sandor Balogh, which took place in Bluewater, Greenhithe, Kent on the James DeGale undercard when DeGale fought Hadiliah Mohoumadi for the European super-middleweight title on 13 October 2012. Whyte won the bout but was later stripped of the win due to testing positive for banned substances.

Drug ban in 2012
A sample for an in-competition drugs test that Whyte had provided after his victory over Hungary's Sandor Balogh on 13 October was examined and subsequently tested positive for the banned stimulant Methylhexaneamine (MHA). The revelation came while Whyte was en route to a news conference to announce a fight for the English title. The UK Anti-Doping (UKAD) organisation confirmed that Whyte was provisionally suspended from all competition from 5 November 2012. An independent National Anti-Doping Panel (NADP) found that the case warranted a two-year ban. However, Whyte appealed the ban, though the appeal panel retorted by emphasising the confirmed two-year ban; the tribunal had accepted Whyte's claim that he did not knowingly take MHA, but rejected his appeal because he did not do enough to check the supplement's ingredients, as Charles Flint QC, the chairman of the appeal tribunal, explained in his written verdict.

In its first instance decision, the NADP found that Whyte failed to seek professional or medical advice before using the supplement Jack3d, which he had bought over the counter from a nutritional supplement shop. Consequently, they stated that he had "failed to discharge the burden of establishing that he was not significantly at fault" and therefore could not reduce his sanction from two years. The appeal panel agreed with this decision, stressing that the case emphasised "the dangers of athletes taking supplements which contain MHA".

Whyte was thereby banned from all competition with a period of ineligibility from 13 October 2012 to 12 October 2014, and the result against Balogh disqualified. As Whyte and company exercised the right to appeal under article 13.4.1, they had no further right to appeal under the rules.

Return to boxing in 2014
Whyte was cleared to compete from 12 October 2014, since his two-year ban by UKAD and returned to boxing on 21 November 2014 at the Camden Centre in London to fight Ante Verunica, a fight which lasted all of two rounds as Whyte delivered a hard shot that forced a stoppage from referee Jeff Hinds for a TKO victory. On 28 November, one week after his fight with Verunica, Whyte returned to the Camden Centre and put on another dominating display stopping Tomas Mrazek, with Whyte knocking the durable Mrazek down three times in the third round.

On 20 December 2014, Whyte scored another TKO win, this time over heavyweight hope Kamil Sokolowski in three rounds at the City Hall in Hull.

Whyte followed up his Sokolowski win with a KO victory over Marcelo Luiz Nascimento on 7 February 2015 at the Camden Centre to which the Brazilian had never been stopped as quickly in his career.

Whyte's next fight after Nascimento was against undefeated Beka Lobjanidze, which took place on 28 February in the Odyssey Arena in Belfast, on the undercard of The World Is Not Enough Belfast boxing card featuring Carl Frampton's defense against Christopher Avalos for the IBF junior-featherweight title. Whyte scored a fourth-round stoppage over Lobjanidze in a scheduled ten-round bout, as Whyte landed a hard left to the side of the head which sent Lobjanidze to the canvas and he was unable to beat referee Phil Edwards' count at 1 minute 10 seconds of round four, winning by KO.

On 1 August 2015, Whyte faced Irineu Beato Costa Junior, at the KC Lightstream Stadium in Hull, on the undercard of Rumble on the Humber featuring Luke Campbell's clash against Tommy Coyle in a WBC lightweight eliminator. Whyte sent the Brazilian crashing backwards to the canvas, and referee Michael Alexander stopped the fight with 2 minutes 41 seconds remaining in the first round as Whyte put Costa back to the floor with a right hand.

Following his victory over Costa, it was announced that Whyte would face Brian Minto at The O2 Arena for the WBC International Silver heavyweight title on the undercard of Anthony Joshua's title clash with Gary Cornish on 12 September. He defeated Minto by KO in the third round, having already knocked him down once in the first round.

Whyte vs. Joshua 

On 14 September 2015, it was announced that Whyte would fight old rival Anthony Joshua for the vacant British heavyweight title on 12 December at The O2 Arena in London on Sky Sports Box Office. Joshua was able to use his power to hurt Whyte in the first round. He appeared hurt again in the second round but was able to catch Joshua with a counterpunch and follow it up, leaving Joshua visibly shaken. Whyte also landed several body shots towards the end of the round. This continued somewhat in the third round with Joshua still looking tired and stiff legged. As the rounds went on, Joshua regained his composure and took control. Whyte took many hard shots before coming back with his own, his chin has since been lauded by critics. Whyte was rocked again in the seventh round from a heavy right hand to the temple. Joshua was able to follow through and landed an uppercut that put Whyte down through the ropes and knocked him out.

Regaining composure 
Following the loss to Joshua, Whyte spent some time recovering from a shoulder surgery and returned to the boxing ring on Joshua's first world title defence at The O2 Arena on 25 June 2016. Prior to the fight, Whyte signed a deal with Matchroom Sport. Whyte defeated Ivica Bacurin via KO. Whyte started off slow, before working on the jab and knocking Bacurin out with a right hand.

Whyte next fought at the First Direct arena in Leeds on 30 July against David Allen for the vacant WBC International heavyweight title. In what was expected to be a tough fight for Whyte, the fight went the full ten-round distance. Whyte won the fight with a comfortable UD, with the judges scoring the fight 100–90, 100–91, and 99–91.

It was announced on 19 September that Whyte would fight domestic veteran Ian Lewison for the vacant British heavyweight title in Glasgow on the undercard of Ricky Burns vs. Kiryl Relikh on 7 October. Whyte and Lewison had to be separated at the weigh-in press conference. Both fighters promised KOs. Whyte defeated Lewison to claim the vacant title via tenth-round stoppage victory. The fight was stopped in round ten by Lewison's corner. It appeared that he had a nose problem that caused the fight to be halted. Although Lewison looked good from the opening bell, Whyte started taking control from round three onwards. In round ten, Lewison turned his back to started blowing his nose. Whyte missed with a big right hand. From there on, Lewison started boxing defensively before the fight was eventually stopped, declaring Whyte the winner.

Whyte vs. Chisora 
Terms were finally agreed for a fight between Whyte and bitter London rival Derek Chisora (26–6, 18 KOs) to fight in a WBC title eliminator. Whyte and Chisora had been feuding over the year through social media. The fight took place on Sky Box Office in the UK on the undercard off Anthony Joshua vs. Éric Molina for the IBF heavyweight title. The fight was slated to be Whyte's first defence of the British heavyweight title he won against Lewison. However, at the final press conference on 7 December, following Whyte's comment that he'd attack Chisora anytime he sees him after the fight, Chisora picked up the table he was sitting at and threw it towards Whyte, just missing everyone in the way which included the promoters and trainers. As a result, the British Boxing Board of Control withdrew their sanction of the fight and the British title would not be at stake. Whyte's WBC International title was at stake instead. In a contest in which both fighters were hurt, with Chisora and Whyte showing a lot of heart, Whyte won via split decision (SD). Two judges scoring the fight 115–113 and 115–114 for Whyte, and one scoring 115–114 in favour of Chisora. Whyte was hurt a number of times in the fight by Chisora; in the eighth, tenth and twelfth rounds. On two occasions in the twelfth, Whyte was knocked off balance by Chisora after being hit with huge shots to the head. Post fight, Whyte stated he would not give Chisora a rematch but changed his mind later saying he would be open to a rematch.

In April 2017 it was announced that Whyte would headline a card at The O2 Arena on 3 June 2017. Whyte listed Bryant Jennings, Mariusz Wach, Artur Szpilka and Gerald Washington as potential opponents. On 14 April, Washington put his name forward wanting to get back into the world title mix following his failed attempt to dethrone WBC heavyweight champion Deontay Wilder in February 2017. On 19 April, Matchroom Boxing revealed Whyte's opponent would be 37 year old former world title challenger Mariusz Wach (33–2, 17 KOs). The fight was to take place live on Sky Sports and would also feature younger talents including Reece Bellotti, Ted Cheeseman and Lawrence Okolie. The fight was postponed on 16 May due to Whyte injuring his foot. There was no immediate mention as to when the fight would be rescheduled for.

In early June, promoter Eddie Hearn of Matchroom Boxing confirmed that Whyte would be making his US debut in the Summer of 2017 in order to earn himself a potential world title shot by the end of the year. On 25 July, Hearn announced that Whyte would fight 44 year old former world title challenger Michael Grant (48–7, 36 KOs), who was on a three fight losing streak since 2013. Grant had only fought once since October 2014, which took place in April 2017 in a KO loss to Krzysztof Zimnoch. Grant unsuccessfully challenged then unified heavyweight champion Lennox Lewis in 2000. The fight lasted less than six minutes. The announcement received a lot of criticism and bad press from the media and fans. Two days later, Grant confirmed the fight was cancelled. On 6 August, after struggling to find an opponent, Hearn revealed that Whyte would fight 15-year veteran Malcolm Tann (24–5, 13 KOs) in a scheduled eight-round fight on the undercard of Terence Crawford vs. Julius Indongo. Whyte knocked Tann down four times en route to winning the fight via TKO in round three. Whyte admitted he needed a bigger challenge towards the end of the year before a potential world title fight.

Whyte vs. Helenius 
Eddie Hearn announced that Whyte would fight on the Anthony Joshua vs. Carlos Takam (originally Kubrat Pulev) card on 28 October at the Principality Stadium in Cardiff. Robert Helenius and Lucas Browne were two names mentioned. On 14 September, seven weeks before the fight, Ricky Hatton stated Browne wouldn't take up the fight due to being short notice. Some reported suggested Whyte would fight former two-time European champion Robert Helenius (25–1, 16 KOs). After Luis Ortiz failed a drug test, leaving Deontay Wilder without an opponent, Whyte offered to take his place. The world title fight was ultimately given to mandatory challenger Bermane Stiverne for 4 November. Jarrell Miller was also considered an option before he booked himself a fight with Mariusz Wach in New York. On 4 October Hearn revealed he was interested in getting Dominic Breazeale to fight Whyte, where the winner could potentially fight the winner of the Wilder vs. Stiverne rematch. A couple of days later, Breazeale accepted the challenge. The talks eventually broke down. On 15 October, Hearn announced Whyte vs. Helenius. Whyte failed to impress as he defeated Helenius over twelve rounds via UD. The scorecards read 119–109 twice, and 118–110 all in favour of Whyte. Helenius started the fight well hurting Whyte in the second round. Whyte bounced back and dominated the remainder of the fight with Helenius reluctant to throw anything meaningful to win the rounds. With the win, Whyte claimed the vacant WBC Silver heavyweight title, moving him a step closer to fighting world champion Wilder.

Career from 2018

Whyte vs. Browne 
On 11 January 2018, a fight between Whyte and Lucas Browne (25–0, 22 KOs) was finally made, to take place at The O2 Arena in London on 24 March. Whyte's WBC Silver title would be at stake. Speaking of the fight, Whyte said, "I can't wait, I hate Lucas Browne and I want to hurt him. He's said some nasty things and he's going to have to pay for them." Whyte hit Browne with a hard left hook to the head in the round six to knock him unconscious, winning the fight. There was no count made and the fight was waved off immediately with ringside doctors attending to Browne before giving him oxygen. The fight was officially stopped at 37 seconds of the round. Browne's face was cut and badly swollen from the clean shots landed from Whyte. Browne left himself open most of the time and tried switching stances after a few rounds. Browne suffered a cut over his left eye in round three, which got worse with each round. Whyte then bloodied Browne's nose in round five. After the fight, Browne was stretchered from the ring and taken to a nearby hospital for precaution. In the post-fight interview, Whyte called out WBC champion Deontay Wilder for a fight in June 2018. Promoter Eddie Hearn said, "I hope the WBC make Dillian mandatory now, the fight is there for Deontay Wilder in June. We have to force the shot and after that performance, he deserves the shot." Hearn stated there could be a possibility that the WBC order a final eliminator between Whyte and Dominic Breazeale.

Whyte vs. Parker 
On 24 April, the WBC ordered Whyte vs. Luis Ortiz in an eliminator bout for their heavyweight champion, Deontay Wilder. Whyte felt 'betrayed' by this decision from the WBC as he thought he was already in line to challenge Wilder next. The WBC made Dominic Breazeale the mandatory challenger, although they previously confirmed his win over Eric Molina was not a final eliminator. Whyte stated, if anything, the WBC should order Whyte vs. Breazeale as the final eliminator. Promoter Eddie Hearn was also puzzled by the decision. At the same time, the IBF also ordered Whyte to fight former world title challenger Kubrat Pulev (25–1, 13 KO). A purse bid was set for 10 May. The purse bids were delayed as a deal between Hearn and Team Sauerland, Pulev's promoter, was close to being agreed. The IBF gave them until 24 May. Despite Whyte stating that Pulev did not want the fight, Pulev stated he was more than happy to fight Whyte, but "a lot of things need to be agreed" before the fight could be confirmed. According to Nisse Sauerland, the date of 28 July was being discussed with the host venue being either London or Bulgaria. New York based promotional company, Epic Sports & Entertainment, made a purse bid of $1,500,111, winning the rights of the fight. Eddie Hearn offered $831,111, which was higher than the $801,305 bid from Team Sauerland. IBF rules state, for a final eliminator, the higher ranked boxer, in this case Pulev, would get 75% ($1,125,083.25) and Whyte would earn $375,027.75 for the fight. On 6 June, although the Whyte vs. Pulev fight was not off the table, it was heavily rumoured via multiple sources that Whyte would instead fight Luis Ortiz in a WBC final eliminator. Many media outlets announced the fight. Pulev was unhappy with the pull out and labelled Whyte and Hearn as "extreme manipulators and plain schizophrenics" as well as accusing them of avoiding him at all costs.

On the morning of 7 June, it was confirmed that Whyte would instead fight former WBO heavyweight champion Joseph Parker (24–1, 18 KOs) on 28 July at The O2 Arena in London on Sky Box Office. An official press conference followed a few hours later. Many fans took to social media stating their frustration around the fight being on pay-per-view. Whyte, along with Parker's promoter David Higgins, explained their reasons as to why the fight deserved to be on the PPV platform. The fight itself was praised by fans for the match up, with it being billed as an eliminator for the winner to challenge Anthony Joshua for the unified heavyweight titles. Three days before the fight, it was confirmed a sell-out. It was revealed that before PPV revenue, both boxers would earn just over £1 million for the fight, with Whyte receiving slightly more, being the home fighter. Despite stating he would weigh less, Whyte came in at  pounds, 4 pounds heavier than his previous bout. Parker weighed 242 pounds, 16 pounds lighter than Whyte, however 6 pounds heavier than what he weighed in his loss to Joshua.

Whyte won the bout via UD in a fight which saw both boxers hit the canvas. Whyte knocked Parker down twice in the fight, dropping him in rounds two and nine. It looked as though a short left hook dropped Parker for the first time in his career, however the instant replay showed it was a clash of heads. Referee Ian John Lewis made the count. Most of the middle rounds were mostly back and forth action with both fighters having success. Whyte was coming forward, countering and began using his jab more while Parker was mostly on the back foot, using movement and landing 2-3 punch combinations. After round six, Whyte began to show fatigue. This did not prevent him from carrying on going forward and trying to land big shots as Parker was wary of Whyte's power. Whyte also started using roughhouse tactics after the first few rounds. This included rabbit punches, head-butting, holding and hitting and pushing Parker over the ropes. He was warned once earlier in the fight and then warned again in the final rounds, however no points were deducted. Parker took over in the final rounds but was unable to put Whyte away. Parker had an explosive start to round twelve, knowing he needed a knockout to win, he eventually knocked down a fatigued Whyte with 20 seconds left in the fight with a right hand to the head. Whyte got to his feet and survived the remaining seconds of the fight. The three judges scored the fight unanimously 115–110, 114–111, and 113–112 in favour of Whyte. Many of the pundits ringside, which included Steve Bunce, had the fight closer including those on radio, with some even having Parker as the winner. Some portion of the boxing media also scored the fight close, in favour of Parker. The Sky Sports team, which included Matthew Macklin, David Haye, Johnny Nelson and Tony Bellew, were criticized for their views.

Standing together, speaking to Sky Sports after the fight, Whyte gave Parker credit, "He was slick and I knew he was going to fight for the first few rounds, then come back in the final few rounds. I am annoyed I slipped at the final hurdle in the last round. I was rocked and took a few." Whyte stated he would take another fight before the end of 2018 and ready for Anthony Joshua in April 2019, "I would like to fight Joshua again if he wants it. I've still got a lot to learn, so I would like to get one more in before him again." Parker had no complaints and humble in defeat, "I gave it my best; the better man and I will come back stronger." Parker's trainer Kevin Barry was very vocal after the fight regarding Whyte's rough tactics, claiming he should have had points taken off.

In the post-fight press conference, Hearn spoke of Whyte's next potential fights. Derek Chisora, who knocked out Carlos Takam on the undercard, was mentioned, however Whyte stated he was not interested as he 'had bigger fish to fry'. Hearn revealed he would offer Wilder in the region of £6 million ($8m US) to fight Whyte in New York. On 31 July, Whyte told BoxingScene he was interested in fighting WBA (Regular) champion Manuel Charr.

On 3 August, it was reported that Duco Events would appeal for the decision to be investigated. The reason for this was because Parker's team believed the head clash in round two, which dropped Parker to the canvas, affected the scorecards as well as Parker's performance during the middle rounds. It is believed that Parker was having success in round two before the head clash, therefore had the knockdown not occurred, the round would have been scored 10–9 in favour of Parker instead 10–8 for Whyte. In a statement, Higgins said, "It's clear that the clash of heads in the second round had a significant impact on the fight. In terms of the scorecards and Joseph's performance in the middle rounds (the headbutt made a big difference). In light of what is clear evidence of a significant error by the officials, there is a legitimate question as to whether the result should stand. That's a question Duco will be asking the sanctioning bodies on Joseph's behalf." Looking at the alternative scorecard, having round two in favour of Parker would have resulted in the bout being scored a split decision draw.

Whyte vs. Chisora II 

In mid October 2018, Whyte and Luis Ortiz appeared to have a war of words and called each other out, with Ortiz stating he would come to the UK and fight Whyte on 22 December, a potential PPV date allocated to the possible Whyte vs. Chisora rematch. After hearing this, Chisora came out saying 'No one wants to see that [Whyte-Ortiz]', that he was 'the Money Man' and Whyte should fight him if he wants to earn more money. Hearn also stated despite Ortiz putting his name forward, Chisora was the front-runner to fight Whyte.

On 17 October, it was reported that Chisora had hired former rival David Haye as his new manager. They also stated that Chisora will no longer go by the name 'Del Boy' and would now be 'WAR'. On 22 October, Whyte told Sky Sports that Chisora needed to sign a deal quick or he would look at other options. On 1 November, the rematch was announced to take place on 22 December at The O2 Arena on Sky Sports Box Office. Chisora was ranked #5 by the WBA and IBF, #7 by the WBC and #11 by the WBO at heavyweight.

Whyte won by KO in the eleventh round, from a powerful left hook. Whyte had luck in the early rounds, catching Chisora, but Chisora continued to work away, and received two warnings for low blows on Whyte, which arguably switched the tempo of the fight. After the win, Whyte called out Anthony Joshua and then stormed off mid-discussion.

Whyte vs. Rivas 

Following his eleventh-round knockout victory over Chisora, Whyte called out unified heavyweight champion Anthony Joshua. Joshua, who was unusually booed by many of those present at the O2 Arena, said: "If Deontay Wilder is serious and he is going to fight Tyson Fury and doesn't want to become undisputed champion, Dillian, you will get a title shot." On 12 January 2019, Whyte revealed that he had turned down a "severe lowball" offer from Joshua to fight him in a rematch. Whyte did not reveal the figure, however, he claimed it was lower than what he received against Chisora in December 2018. Whyte claimed the Joshua fight "was dead" and he was to look at other options, including a potential fight with Dominic Breazeale for the WBC interim title, but Breazeale challenged Deontay Wilder for the world title. WBC-NABF, IBF International, and WBO-NABO champion Óscar Rivas, had enhanced his reputation as a danger man following his brutal KO of the former world title challenger Bryant Jennings in January.

On the 20 July 2019, Whyte and Rivas fought for the vacant WBC interim heavyweight title. Rivas was ranked #5 by the WBO, #7 by the WBA, #8 by the IBF and #10 by the WBC. The fight took place at The O2 Arena in London. It was agreed the winner of the fight would become the mandatory for the WBC title held by Deontay Wilder, even though Whyte had held the WBC's number one ranking for over a year. During the first few rounds of the fight, Rivas walked forward while Whyte used his long jab to keep him at bay. Whyte was rocked by Rivas a few times but came back quickly with his own combinations that made Rivas cover up and in the ninth-round Rivas dropped Whyte which he blamed on him crossing his legs while backing up. Whyte went on to win by UD and was later suspended of the WBC interim title after a drugs test came back with inconclusive results. He was later reinstated in December after being fully cleared before the fight against Mariusz Wach.

Whyte vs. Wach 
On 7 December 2019, Whyte faced Mariusz Wach on the Andy Ruiz Jr. vs. Anthony Joshua II undercard. Whyte won the bout via UD, with two judges scoring the bout 97–93 and the third scoring it 98–93.

Whyte vs. Povetkin 

Whyte was scheduled to defend his WBC interim title against Alexander Povetkin on 2 May 2020, however, due to the COVID-19 pandemic the event was rescheduled for 22 August at the Matchroom Sport headquarters in Brentwood, Essex. Prior to the rescheduled fight, Whyte split with long-time coach Mark Tibbs. He promoted Xavier Miller from his team to head coach. Povetkin was ranked #6 by The Ring and #9 by the WBC at heavyweight. Whyte lost the fight via knockout in the fifth round, losing his WBC interim title and mandatory position for Tyson Fury's WBC title. He had started off well and controlled the fight in the first four rounds, knocking Povetkin down twice in the fourth round. However, just 30 seconds into the following round, Povetkin landed an uppercut which left Whyte flat on his back, prompting the referee to call an immediate halt to the contest.

Whyte vs. Povetkin II 

An immediate rematch with Alexander Povetkin was scheduled for 21 November 2020, but was pushed back to 27 March 2021 when Povetkin tested positive for COVID-19. With fans in attendance, the fight took place in Gibraltar, and was won by Whyte via technical knockout in the fourth round. The win meant that Whyte regained the WBC interim heavyweight title. Following the fight's conclusion, his promoter Eddie Hearn reaffirmed interest in staging a fight between Whyte and former WBC champion Deontay Wilder, calling a potential Wilder vs. Whyte showdown "a stadium fight, that's a colossal fight".

Whyte vs. Fury 

On 15 September 2021, it was reported that terms had been agreed between Whyte and Otto Wallin for a bout on 30 October at the O2 Arena in London for Whyte's WBC interim heavyweight title. However, a mere ten days before the fight was scheduled to occur, it was reported that the fight had been called off due to Whyte suffering a shoulder injury. Whyte ultimately did not reschedule the bout against Wallin, opting instead to wait for a shot at undefeated WBC and The Ring champion Tyson Fury, who himself had previously fought and defeated Wallin in September 2019.

On 30 December 2021, WBC president Mauricio Sulaiman, who had ordered Fury to defend his WBC title against Whyte, ruled that the champion Fury would be entitled to 80% of the purse, compared to Whyte's 20% as the challenger. Sulaiman had set a deadline of 11 January 2022 for purse bids, as the two fighters' camps could not agree to terms. However, this deadline was pushed back multiple times, in part due to ongoing negotiations from Fury's team who were trying to secure the fight for the undisputed heavyweight championship against undefeated WBA (Super), IBF and WBO heavyweight champion Oleksandr Usyk. A fight between Fury and Usyk did not materialise, as deposed former champion Anthony Joshua was unwilling to step aside to allow the two champions to fight.

The deadline for the Fury-Whyte purse bids was ultimately scheduled for 28 January 2022, when it was announced that Frank Warren's Queensberry Promotions had won the rights to promote the fight, with a winning bid of $41,025,000 (£31 million), beating out the $32,222,222 (£24 million) bid submitted by Eddie Hearn's Matchroom. Warren's bid was reported to be the highest successful purse bid in boxing history.

The first press conference for the fight took place on 1 March at Wembley Stadium, with Whyte absent. Whyte's lawyer stated that his client would not be partaking in promoting the fight, as "we still do not have things resolved". Despite his opponent's non-attendance, Fury as usual was "in full showman mode", declaring, "Even Tyson Fury versus his own shadow sells", and promising that the fight "is going to be a Ferrari racing a Vauxhall Corsa". When asked about Whyte's no-show, Fury opined, "He's definitely shown the white flag in my estimation." In addition, he stated that his bout against Whyte would be the final fight of his professional career, promising to retire after the fight: "I'm a two-time undisputed world champion. [I have] £150m in the bank and nothing to prove to anybody."

Tickets for the fight went on sale on 2 March. 85,000 of the 90,000 available tickets were sold within the first 3 hours, prompting Fury's promoter Frank Warren to begin the process of applying to the local authorities to expand the capacity to 100,000 fans, which would make Fury-Whyte the largest post-war boxing attendance in the history of the United Kingdom. The contest ultimately took place in front of a record-breaking crowd of 94,000 fans: 4,000 more than the attendance of Anthony Joshua vs. Wladimir Klitschko which also took place at Wembley Stadium in 2017, thus setting a new attendance record for a boxing match in Europe.

Whyte unexpectedly boxed the first round in the southpaw stance, which was unusual for the primarily orthodox fighter. After a cautious first three minutes, Fury returned the favour at the start of the second round by switching between the southpaw and orthodox stances. The champion found success with the jab and check hook. In the fourth round, Whyte was cut over his right eye after a clash of heads. Fury continued to dominate the fight, landing a straight right in the fifth round which appeared to momentarily stun the challenger. With around ten seconds left of the sixth round, Fury landed a left jab, followed by a right uppercut which sent Whyte sprawling to the canvas. Although Whyte was able to beat the count and rise to his feet, the referee deemed it unsafe for him to continue, halting the fight after two minutes and fifty-nine seconds of the sixth round, declaring Fury the winner by sixth-round technical knockout. At the time of the stoppage, Whyte was behind on the judges' scorecards with 49–46, 48–47, and 50–45.

Whyte vs. Franklin 

The bout was held at the Wembley Arena, London, England on the 26 November 2022 and Whyte won via majority decision by the scores of 115–115 and 116–112 (twice).

Personal life
Whyte has two sons and one daughter. He had his first child at 13 years old, making him one of the youngest birth fathers on record. He has highlighted his early boxing idols as including Jack Dempsey, Sonny Liston, Archie Moore, Lennox Lewis and James Toney.

Mixed martial arts record

|-
| Win
| align=center| 1–0
| Mark Stroud
| KO (punch)
| UCMMA 1: Bad Breed
| 
| align=center| 1
| align=center| 0:12
| London, England
|

Professional boxing record

Pay-per-view bouts

Notes

References

External links

Dillian Whyte - Profile, News Archive & Current Rankings at Box.Live

English people of Irish descent
Jamaican people of Irish descent
Super-heavyweight boxers
1988 births
English Muay Thai practitioners
English sportspeople in doping cases
Sportspeople from London
Heavyweight kickboxers
Living people
English male boxers
English male kickboxers
English male mixed martial artists
Mixed martial artists utilizing boxing
Mixed martial artists utilizing Muay Thai
Black British sportspeople
People from Brixton
English people of Jamaican descent
Heavyweight boxers
Jamaican male boxers
Jamaican male kickboxers
Jamaican Muay Thai practitioners
Jamaican male mixed martial artists
British Boxing Board of Control champions
People from Port Antonio